Acacia phacelia, also known as the Kimberley cluster wattle, is a shrub belonging to the genus Acacia and the subgenus Juliflorae that is endemic to a small area in north western Australia.

Description
It has slender and terete branchlets that are densely covered in fine soft hairs. Like most species of Acacia it has phyllodes rather than true leaves. The phyllodes occur in clusters of two to eight at the more mature nodes but singly on new shoots. Following flowering firmly crustaceous, red-brown coloured seed pods will form.

Distribution
It is native to a small area in the west Kimberley region of Western Australia.

See also
List of Acacia species

References

phacelia
Acacias of Western Australia
Plants described in 2013
Taxa named by Bruce Maslin
Taxa named by Russell Lindsay Barrett
Taxa named by Matthew David Barrett